Pennino Brothers Jewelry was a United States jeweller founded by Oreste, Frank and Jack Pennino in 1926 and based in New York City. It designed and manufactured costume jewelry using rhinestones set in gold plate, sterling, vermeil or rhodium-plated base metal. Many of these pieces were made by Italian immigrants, such as Adrian Scannavino and Benedetto Panetta.  The designs were traditional and classic.

References
Pennino Jewelry Three Neapolitan Princes and the Legacy of Pennino

Jewelry retailers of the United States